Patricia C. Mwashingwele (1968-2019) was a Zambian politician, Member of Parliament for Katuba Constituency.

Life
Patricia Mwashingwele was born on 30th September 1968. Her mother was a teacher, and she was a teacher before becoming a member of Parliament.

After the 2011 general elections, Mwashingwele was the deputy president of Frank Bwalya's Alliance for Better Zambia party. Though the couple fell out and Bwalya fired her, he expressed continued regard for her:

In the 2016 Zambian general election Mwashingwele was elected to the National Assembly, as the UPND candidate for Katuba. She beat the incumbent Jonas Shakafuswa, who had left UPND to stand on the Patriotic Front ticket.

Mwashingwele died on May 2nd 2019, at the University Teaching Hospital in Lusaka. She was buried in Katuba.

References

1968 births
2019 deaths
21st-century Zambian women politicians
21st-century Zambian politicians
United Party for National Development politicians
Members of the National Assembly of Zambia